Valvassori is an Italian surname. Notable people with the surname include:

Domenico Valvassori (1627–1689), Italian Roman Catholic prelate
Gabriele Valvassori (1683–1761), Italian architect
Leonardo Valvassori, American bassist, cellist, and audio engineer

Italian-language surnames